Kašava is a municipality and village in Zlín District in the Zlín Region of the Czech Republic. It has about 900 inhabitants.

Twin towns – sister cities

Kašava is twinned with:
 Breitenbach, France
 Rohožník, Slovakia

References

Villages in Zlín District